Zimbabwe Metro (zimbabwemetro.com) was an internet newspaper published in Zimbabwe. It had a strong focus on events in Zimbabwe's major cities. The newspaper was first published independently in 2007.

The paper's  website is an aggregated weblog, featuring hyperlinks to various news sources and columnists.  The site covers a wide range of topics, including sections devoted to politics, entertainment, media, living, and business.  Its roster of bloggers includes many people from Zimbabwe's politicians to its extensive network of prominent writers. It is ranked the most visited news weblog on Zimbabwe News by Alexa Internet.

The paper seems to have become defunct online between July 2012 and January 2014.

History
Zimbabwe Metro was launched on October 10, 2007 as a news and commentary outlet.  It was based in neighbouring Botswana.

The paper seems to have become defunct online between July 2012 and January 2014.

Contributors
In addition to regular (often daily) news by its reporters and a core group of contributors the Zimbabwe Metro has featured notable celebrity contributors from politics, journalism, business, and entertainment. The Zimbabwe Metro offers both news commentary and coverage. It has a standing policy of encouraging comments from all parts of the political spectrum. The comment section is home to discussions on politics, religion, and world affairs.

A comprehensive list of contributors to the Zimbabwe Metro blog can be found at
Contributors .

Circulation
Zimbabwe Metro 's print edition 's circulation has been put on hold  due to the economic conditions  in Zimbabwe. However its website is popular, updated frequently and accessible for free since November 2007.

The format of the newspaper was tabloid and is designed to be read in 20 minutes. The features section contains a mix of articles on travel, homes, style, health and so on, as well as extensive arts coverage and entertainment listings.

Controversy
The Zimbabwe Metros Metro girl section featuring scant dressed women was once suspended as it was a consistent subject of controversy and criticism throughout the Zimbabwean community.

Other info

Other names

Short names
 Zimbabwe Metro is known in its shortened form as the  zimmetro.

See also
 Media of Zimbabwe
 List of newspapers in Zimbabwe

Notes

References

Sources
 </ref>
 The Guardian: Zimbabwe power-sharing deal: LIVE
 BBC Newsnight Zimbabwe's best blog
 Reuters Zimbabwe bloggers wait impatiently

External links
The Zimbabwe Metro Online Edition

English-language newspapers published in Africa
Newspapers published in Zimbabwe
Zimbabwean news websites
2007 establishments in Zimbabwe